Anomia trigonopsis, also known as the New Zealand jingle, is a species of marine bivalve mollusc in the family Anomiidae, the anomiids.

References
 Powell A W B, New Zealand Mollusca, William Collins Publishers Ltd, Auckland, New Zealand 1979 

Anomiidae
Bivalves of New Zealand
Molluscs described in 1877